Chen Shu-fang (born July 2, 1939) is a Taiwanese actress. She made her film debut in 1957 and television debut in 1971. In 2020, she was the recipient of the Best Actress and Best Supporting Actress at the 57th Golden Horse Awards.

Early life 
Chen Shu-fang was born in July 2, 1939, in Káu-hūn (九份). Her real name is Siao Chen; Siao means "smile" in Chinese. Her grandfather gave her this name to hope that she would smile more often. In addition, her stage name, Shu-Fang, is the combination of her virtuous personality and her hometown, Ruifang. Her father was the person in charge of quarries; Her uncle was a town mayor.

When she was young, acting was not considered a respectable profession, and her grandfather was against her becoming an actress. Therefore, she pretended that she wanted to be a director, so she would be able to go to National Taiwan University of Arts and get access to the entertainment industry. However, her family situation began to decline after her father’s death. Chen had no choice but to drop out of school and take the responsibility of her family’s finances. As a result, she took part in a lot of movies and films just to make a living.

Because of her passion for dancing, she was noticed by her instructor, Zhang-Ying in National Taiwan University of Arts. Hence, she participated in the stage show directed by her instructor. During the performance, she attracted a scout’s attention and was invited to act the leading role in Whose Sin (1957) which making her debut in 1957. She acted in many Taiwanese movies, which happened to be the time of Taiwanese movies’ first heyday. Having a fair and beautiful appearance, Chen was known as “pocket beauty” in Taiwanese film industry. At that time, she also taught dancing when she was not filming the movies.

Career 
Chen made her debut in 1958. As one of the students of National Taiwan University of Arts, Chen has played in numerous films, some of which are outstanding television series, such as Phi Long Đại Hiệp (飛龍在天), Perfect Neighbors (親戚不計較), and Taiwan Tornado (台灣龍捲風), and others are acclaimed movies like A Borrowed Life (1994), A City of Sadness (1989), and Taipei Story (1985).

Public image

Grandmother of Taiwan 
Since she played the role of mother as the first character in her career and earned excellent reviews afterward, she has continued to play the roles of mother and grandmother in the following performances. Thus she received a long-lasting public image as a mother or grandmother. As a result of that she got the title "Grandmother of Taiwan" in the late part of her career when she became a senior actress.

Philanthropist 
She has made many endorsements for public service announcements, such as anti-fraud, anti-drug, and health check promotion. She also dedicated her efforts to charity actively. For example, she cared for underprivileged groups such as those living alone, donating new year's food and money to them during the Chinese new year and donating masks since those were highly demanded during the covid-19 pandemic.

Personal life 
Chen became pregnant in her early 20s. The child's father was already married.

In 1978, she had a romance with Liang in Australia. She migrated to Australia in 1980 to marry Liang. However, the marriage was abusive and she had to sneak back to Taiwan. Her husband would follow to Taiwan until he later remarried. The divorce was finalized in 2009.

She has a grandson and a granddaughter studying in National Taiwan University.

According to the Mirror Media's report on 2021 October 13, her endorsement of iVENOR's health food NMN EX was accused of being an unfair and deceptive advertisement.

Awards and accolades

References 

1939 births
Living people
20th-century Taiwanese actresses
21st-century Taiwanese actresses
Taiwanese film actresses
Taiwanese stage actresses
Taiwanese television actresses